The 12265 / 66 Delhi Sarai Rohilla-Jammu Tawi Duronto Express is a Superfast Express train of the Duronto Express category belonging to Indian Railways - Northern Railway zone that runs between Delhi Sarai Rohilla and Jammu Tawi in India.

It operates as train number 12265 from Delhi Sarai Rohilla to Jammu Tawi and as train number 12266 in the reverse direction serving the states of Delhi and Jammu and Kashmir.

Coaches

The 12265 / 66 Delhi Sarai Rohilla Jammu Tawi Duronto Express presently has 1 AC First Class,1 AC 2 tier, 7 AC 3 tier, 10 Sleeper Class & 2 SLR (Seating cum Luggage Rake) coaches. It does not carry a Pantry car coach.

As is customary with most train services in India, Coach Composition may be amended at the discretion of Indian Railways depending on demand.

Service

The 12265 / 66 Delhi Sarai Rohilla Jammu Tawi Duronto Express covers the distance of 578 kilometres in 09 hours 00 mins (64.22 km/hr) in both directions.

As the average speed of the train is above , as per Indian Railways rules, its fare includes a Superfast Express surcharge.

Routeing & Technical Halts

The 12265 / 66 Delhi Sarai Rohilla Jammu Tawi Duronto Express runs from Delhi Sarai Rohilla having a single technical stop at Ludhiana Junction to Jammu Tawi.

Traction

Previously, despite electrification of the 312 km route between Delhi Sarai Rohilla & Ludhiana Junction. i.e. 54% of the route, it was powered by a Tughlakabad based WDM 3A or WDP 4 for its entire journey.

With progressive electrification, a Ghaziabad based WAP 7 now powers the train for the entire journey.

Timings

12265 Delhi Sarai Rohilla Jammu Tawi Duronto Express leaves Delhi Sarai Rohilla every Tuesday, Friday & Sunday and reaches Jammu Tawi the next day.

12266 Jammu Tawi Delhi Sarai Rohilla Duronto Express leaves Jammu Tawi every Monday, Wednesday & Saturday and reaches Delhi Sarai Rohilla the next day.

References

External links

Transport in Jammu
Transport in Delhi
Duronto Express trains
Rail transport in Delhi
Rail transport in Jammu and Kashmir
Rail transport in Punjab, India
Railway services introduced in 2010